Artur Żmijewski (born 26 May 1966 in Warsaw) is a Polish visual artist, filmmaker and photographer. During the years of 1990–1995 he studied at Warsaw Academy of Fine Arts. He is an author of short video movies and photography exhibitions, which were shown all over the world. Since 2006 he is artistic editor of the "Krytyka Polityczna".

His solo show If It Happened Only Once It's As If It Never Happened was at "Kunsthalle Basel" in 2005, the same year in which he represented Poland at the 51st Venice Biennale. He has shown in Documenta 12 (2007), and Manifesta 4 (2002); Wattis Institute for Contemporary Art, San Francisco (2012, 2005); National Gallery of Art Zacheta, Warsaw (2005); Kunstwerke, Berlin (2004); CAC, Vilnius (2004); "Moderna Museet", Stockholm (1999). Earlier this year he presented Democracies at "Foksal Gallery Foundation", Warsaw; and is making new work for The Museum of Modern Art (Moma) in New York as part of their Projects’ Series in September 2009. "Cornerhouse", Manchester, presented the first major UK survey of Zmijewski's work, spanning his practice from 2003 to the present day, from November 2009 – January 2010. He was the curator of the 7th Berlin Biennale in 2012 – of which he opened the curatorial process as a collaboration.

Berek (The Game of Tag), 1999 has repeatedly brought controversy. The piece depicts nude adults playing tag in the gas chamber of the Stutthof concentration camp.

Notable works

Movies
Note: Titles in brackets are non-official English titles.
 Ja i AIDS (Me and AIDS), 1996
 Ogród botaniczny ZOO (ZOO, The Botanic Garden), 1997
 Oko za Oko (An Eye for an Eye), 1998
 Berek (The Game of Tag), 1999
 KR WP, 2000
 Sztuka kochania (An Art of Love), 2000
 Karolina (Caroline), 2001
 Na spacer (Out for a Walk), 2001
 Lekcja śpiewu 1 (Singing Lesson 1), 2001
 Lekcja śpiewu 2 (Singing Lesson 2), 2003
 Pielgrzymka (Pilgrimage), 2003
 Nasz śpiewnik (Our Songbook), 2003
 Itzik, 2003
 Lisa, 2003
 80064, 2004
 Rendez-vous, 2004
 Powtórzenie (Repetition), 2005
 Wybory.pl, 2005
 Them, 2007
 Democracies, 2009
 Blindly, 2013 (Biennale di Venezia)
 Realism, 2017
 Compassion, 2022

Photographies
 40 Szuflad (40 Drawers), 1995
 Gestures, 2019
 Refugees/Cardboards, 2022

Solo exhibitions
 Tożsamość Dzidzi, 1995, Galeria Przyjaciół A.R., Warsaw, Poland
 Śpiew sardynek, 1996, Galeria a.r.t., Płock, Poland
 Oko za oko, 1998, Centrum Sztuki Współczesnej Zamek Ujazdowski, Warsaw, Poland
 Ausgewahlte Arbeiten, 1999, Galeria Wyspa, Gdańsk, Poland
 Berek, 2000, Galeria a.r.t., Płock, Poland
 Na Spacer, 2001, Galeria Foksal, Warsaw, Poland
 Lekcja śpiewu 1 / Lekcja śpiewu 2, 2003, Fundacja Galerii Foksal, Warsaw, Poland
 Singing lesson 2, 2003, Galerie für Zeitgenössische Kunst Leipzig, Leipzig, Germany
 Singing lesson, 2003, Wilkinson Gallery, London, Great Britain
 Artur Żmijewski. Selected Works 1998–2003, 2004, MIT List Visual Arts Center, Boston, US
 Artur Żmijewski, 2004, Centre d'art Contemporain de Bretigny, Brétigny-sur-Orge, France
 Powtórzenie, 2005, Polski Pawilon na LI Międzynarodowym Biennale w Wenecji, Venezia, Italy
 Artur Żmijewski, 2005, Kunsthalle, Basel, Switzerland
 Artur Żmijewski, 2009, Cornerhouse, Manchester, United Kingdom
 Artur Żmijewski, 2010, Trade (gallery), Nottingham, United Kingdom
 Artur Żmijewski - When Fear Eats the Soul, 2022, PAC - Padiglione d'Arte Contemporanea, Milan, Italy

Group exhibitions

 Documenta 2007, Kassel, Germany
 Double Agent 2008, Institute of Contemporary Arts, London, BALTIC, Gateshead, Warwick Arts Centre, Warwick
 11th International Istanbul Biennial 2009, Istanbul

References

Further reading
 Anthony Downey, "The Lives of Others: Artur Zmijewski's "Repetition", The Stanford Prison Experiment, and the Ethics of Surveillance in Outi Remes and Pam Skelton (eds.), Conspiracy Dwellings: Surveillance in Contemporary Art. Cambridge Scholars Publishing, 2010.

External links
 Artur Żmijewski at culture.pl
 Artur Żmijewski profile at Biografie Genealogia Polska 
 On Artur Żmijewski, spike art quarterly

Polish contemporary artists
Polish film directors
Living people
1966 births
Academy of Fine Arts in Warsaw alumni